The Canada Cup or Maple Cup was a men's invitational international association football tournament for national teams. Its first edition in 1995 was held at Commonwealth Stadium in Edmonton, Alberta and was contested by three nations. The second and final tournament in 1999 was also held in Edmonton and included four nations.

Results

References
1995
1999

 

International association football competitions hosted by Canada
Soccer in Alberta
Soccer in Edmonton
Recurring sporting events established in 1995
International men's association football invitational tournaments